Pine Grove, Oregon may refer to:

Pine Grove, Hood River County, Oregon, a populated place
Pine Grove, Klamath County, Oregon, a populated place
Pine Grove, Umatilla County, Oregon, a locale
Pine Grove, Wasco County, Oregon, a census-designated place
Pine Grove, Washington County, Oregon, a former post office